Ondina coarctata is a species of sea snail, a marine gastropod mollusk in the family Pyramidellidae, the pyrams and their allies.

Description
The shell grows to a length of 5 mm.

Distribution
This species occurs in the following locations:
 European waters (ERMS scope)
 Arctic Norway
 United Kingdom Exclusive Economic Zone

References

External links
 To CLEMAM
 To Encyclopedia of Life
 To World Register of Marine Species

Pyramidellidae
Gastropods described in 1878